Acaronia vultuosa, the spangled cichlid, is a species of cichlid found throughout the Orinoco Basin, including the Casiquiare, Inírida River, and the Vichada River, as well as the Rio Negro.  This species can reach a length of  TL.  It inhabits the waters close to the bank that are rich in vegetation, and preys on smaller fish.

References

Cichlasomatini
Fish described in 1989